Tao is the pinyin romanization of the Chinese surname  (Táo). It listed 31st in the Song-era Hundred Family Surnames poem.

Tào is also a Vietnamese surname derived from the Chinese surname Cao.

Origin
Various Chinese Tao family from;
Qi (surname) (祁)
Public Officer of Zhou Dynasty
Miao people 
Tujia people, Blang people, Yao people, Yi people, Dai people of Minority Group
Mongolian
Tuoheluo, Tuqin, Tuokuer family of Liaoning
Xibe people

Romanization
Tao was romanized T'ao under the Wade-Giles system, although it was common to omit the apostrophe. It is romanized To, Tou and Tow in Cantonese; Tô in Minnan; Tau, Tow in Teochew; and Tháu in Gan.

Distribution
Tao was the 82nd-most-common surname in mainland China, but it was unlisted among the 100 most common Taiwanese surnames.

Tao is a fairly uncommon surname in the United States, being ranked 12,503rd during the 1990 census and 10,033rd during the year 2000 one.

History
Some Zhejiangese Tao who joined the White Banner upon the advent of the Qing dynasty Manchufied their name to Tohoro (Chinese: Tuohuoluo). Notable descendants along this line include Duanfang.

People with the surname
Tao
 David Tao or Tao Zhe, singer
 Tao Kan, Jin Dynasty general and governor
 Tao Luna, sports shooter
 Michael Tao, television actor
 Tao Qian, warlord during the late Han Dynasty
 Tao Yuanming, scholar and poet of the Jin dynasty
 Tao Siju, politician
 Terence Tao, Australian mathematician and 2006 Fields Medalist
 Tao Yang, Professor at UCSB and Chief Scientist at Ask Jeeves
 Tao Zhu, politician
 Tao Hongkai, Chinese-American scholar, activist.
Tohoro
 Duanfang, a Qing-era politician

People with the Japanese surname
, Japanese ski jumper
, Japanese baseball player

References 

Chinese-language surnames
Japanese-language surnames
Individual Chinese surnames